Vijay Kichlu (16 September 1930 – 17 February 2023) was an Indian classical singer. He studied Dhrupad with the Dagar Brothers and Khayal with Latafat Hussain Khan, whose style had a strong connection with Dhrupad. He and his brother, Ravi Kichlu, formed a famous classical vocalist duo.

Kichlu was the founder and head of the ITC Music Academy for 25 years until he decided to retire due to change in management at the ITC headquarters.

Kichlu founded Sangeet Research Academy for patronising and nurturing upcoming talents in Indian classical music. In 2018, he was bestowed with the civilian award Padma Shri by Government of India.

Kichlu died on 17 February 2023, at the age of 93.

References

External links
Web-article
 
 

1930 births
2023 deaths
Kashmiri people
Hindustani singers
20th-century Indian male classical singers
Recipients of the Padma Shri in arts